Daniel "Dani" Giménez Hernández (born 30 July 1983) is a Spanish professional footballer who plays as a goalkeeper.

Club career
Born in Vigo, Galicia, Giménez spent his first eight seasons as a senior in Segunda División B, with Celta de Vigo B and Zamora CF. With the latter, he faced Rayo Vallecano in 2007–08's playoffs, impressing well enough to sign for the club the following year after it had earned a Segunda División promotion.

In his first two seasons with Rayo, Giménez acted as understudy for David Cobeño, starting in the Copa del Rey. In his second, he appeared in seven games to help the team return to La Liga after an eight-year absence.

Giménez made his top-division debut on 28 August 2011 in a 1–1 away draw against Athletic Bilbao. He battled for first-choice status with Cobeño during the campaign.

On 19 July 2013, Giménez signed a one-year deal with AD Alcorcón of the second tier. On 4 July of the following year, he moved to Real Betis in the same league for two seasons.

On 23 May 2018, having acted as a backup for most of his spell, Giménez joined Deportivo de La Coruña, recently relegated to division two. He only missed two league matches during his tenure, but left in August 2020 after suffering relegation.

Giménez signed a short-term deal at UD Logroñés also in the second division on 9 December 2020, as all three first-team goalkeepers (Rubén Miño, Roberto Santamaría and Yaroslav Meykher) were sidelined with injuries.

Career statistics

Honours
Betis
Segunda División: 2014–15

References

External links

1983 births
Living people
Spanish footballers
Footballers from Vigo
Association football goalkeepers
La Liga players
Segunda División players
Segunda División B players
Celta de Vigo B players
Zamora CF footballers
Rayo Vallecano players
AD Alcorcón footballers
Real Betis players
Deportivo de La Coruña players
UD Logroñés players